Michelle Lim Davidson (born 23 July 1987) is an Australian actress. She got her break in television starring on the skit show Ben Elton Live from Planet Earth in 2011.  From 2012 she was a presenter on Play School, a long running Australian TV show and its spin off, Big Ted's Big Adventure. She also played the role of Amy in two seasons of the critically acclaimed comedy series Utopia. Davidson has also had roles in television series Doctor Doctor, Get Krack!n, The Newsreader and Top of the Lake China Girl. In 2022, she appeared in After the Verdict.

The daughter of South Korean parents, Davidson grew up in Newcastle, Australia and attended the Hunter School of Performing Arts and the Western Australian Academy of Performing Arts.

References

Living people
1987 births
21st-century Australian actresses
Australian actresses of Asian descent
Australian children's television presenters
Australian people of Korean descent
Australian women comedians
Australian women television presenters
BBC television presenters
People from Newcastle, New South Wales
Place of birth missing (living people)